Pedro Armando Pagés Ruiz (en: pa-haes) (born February 23, 1914, date of death unknown) was a Cuban baseball player. He played from 1939 to 1951.

References

External links
 and Seamheads

1914 births
Year of death missing
Alijadores de Tampico players
Angeles de Puebla players
Azules de Veracruz players
Cuban expatriate baseball players in Canada
Diablos Rojos del México players
New York Cubans players
Sherbrooke Athletics players
Cuban expatriate baseball players in Mexico
Cuban expatriate baseball players in the United States